The 1974 WFA Cup Final was the 4th final of the FA Women's Cup, England's primary cup competition for women's football teams. It was the fifth final to be held under the direct control of Women's Football Association (FA).

Match

Summary

The match ended 2–1 to Fodens favour.

References

External links
 
 Report at WomensFACup.co.uk

Cup
Women's FA Cup finals
May 1974 sports events in the United Kingdom